Yela is a town in northern Liberia.

Transport 

It is a station on the Lamco iron ore railway.

See also 

 Transport in Liberia
 Railway stations in Liberia

References 

Populated places in Liberia
Nimba County